Reteče is a village in the Municipality of Škofja Loka in the Upper Carniola region of Slovenia.

Church

The parish church in the settlement is dedicated to John the Evangelist. It was first mentioned in documents from 1501, but was rebuilt a number of times.

References

External links

Reteče at Geopedia

Populated places in the Municipality of Škofja Loka